John Alexander Buchanan (October 7, 1843 – September 2, 1921) was a member of the United States House of Representatives from Virginia and a judge of the Supreme Court of Virginia.

Biography

Buchanan was born in Smyth County, Virginia. He received his early education in local schools and later attended Emory and Henry College. During the war, he served in the Stonewall Brigade until he was captured at Battle of Gettysburg and held as a prisoner for two years until 1865. He then entered the University of Virginia to study law. After being admitted to the bar, he began private practice at Abingdon in Washington County. In 1885–87, he was a member of the Virginia House of Delegates and, in 1888, was elected to Congress as a representative of the ninth Congressional District of Virginia and returned for a second term. He was elected to the Virginia Supreme Court of Appeals in 1895 and served as a judge until his term expired in 1915.

References

External links

 Retrieved on 2009-05-12
Southwest Virginia Museum biography of John A. Buchanan (archived)

Justices of the Supreme Court of Virginia
Virginia lawyers
Stonewall Brigade
People of Virginia in the American Civil War
American Civil War prisoners of war
1843 births
1921 deaths
Politicians from Abingdon, Virginia
Democratic Party members of the United States House of Representatives from Virginia
People from Smyth County, Virginia
University of Virginia alumni